An urban stream is a formerly natural waterway that flows through a heavily populated area. Often times, urban streams are low-lying points in the landscape that characterize catchment urbanization. Urban streams are often polluted by urban runoff and combined sewer outflows. Water scarcity makes flow management in the rehabilitation of urban streams problematic.

Description

Governments may alter the flow or course of an urban stream to prevent localized flooding by river engineering: lining stream beds with concrete or other hardscape materials, diverting the stream into culverts and storm sewers, or other means. Some urban streams, such as the subterranean rivers of London, run completely underground. These modifications have often reduced habitat for fish and other species, caused downstream flooding due to alterations of flood plains, and worsened water quality.

Stressors
Toxicants, Ionic concentrations, Available nutrients, Temperature (and light), and Dissolved oxygen are key stressors to urban streams.

Restoration efforts
Some communities have begun stream restoration projects in an attempt to correct the problems caused by alteration, using techniques such as daylighting and fixing stream bank erosion caused by heavy stormwater runoff. Streamflow augmentation to restore habitat and aesthetics is also an option, and recycled water can be used for this purpose.

Urban stream syndrome
Urban stream syndrome (USS) is defined as a consistent observed ecological degradation of streams caused by urbanization. This kind of stream degradation is commonly found in areas near or in urban areas. USS also considers hydrogeomorphology changes which are characterized by a deeper, wider catchment, reduced living space for biota, and altered sediment transport rates. Keep in mind the status of water quality is difficult to assess in urban areas because of the complexity of the pollutions sources. This could be from mining and deforestation, but the main cause can be attributed to urban and suburban development. This is because such land use has a domino effect that can be felt tens of kilometers away. Consistent decrease to ecological health of streams can be from many things, but most can be directly or indirectly attributed to human infrastructure and action. Urban streams tend to be “flashier” meaning they have more frequent and larger high flow events.

Urban streams also suffer from chemical alterations due to pollutants and waste being uncleanly dumped back into rivers and lakes. An example of this is Onondaga Lake. Historically one of the most polluted freshwater lakes in the world, its salinity and toxic constituents like mercury rose to unsafe levels as large corporations begun to set up shop around the lake. High levels of salinity would be disastrous for any native freshwater marine life and pollutants like mercury are dangerous to most organisms.

Higher levels of urbanization typically mean a greater presence of Urban Stream Syndrome.

Hydrology plays a key role in Urban stream syndrome. As urbanization of these streams continue, there is in tern a decrease in the perviousness of the catchment to precipitation, which leads to a decrease in the infiltration and an increase in the surface runoff. This can cause problems during flood discharges. For example, flood discharges in urban catchments were at least 250% higher in urban catchments than in forested catchments in New York and Texas during similar storms.

Treatment
Many water managers treat USS by directly addressing the symptoms, most commonly through channel reconfiguration that includes reshaping rock to address altered hydrology and sediment regimes. In spite of having ecological objectives, this approach has been criticized for addressing physical failures in the system without improving ecological conditions.

See also
Nationwide Urban Runoff Program (NURP) – US research program
Nonpoint source pollution
Subterranean river

References

Bibliography

External links
 Urban Waters Program - U.S. Environmental Protection Agency (EPA)
 Ecosystem Effects of Urban Stream Restoration - EPA

Hydrology and urban planning
Water pollution
Environmental engineering
Water streams
Rivers
Hydrology
Fluvial landforms